The Inter-American Division of Seventh-day Adventists is a sub-entity of the General Conference of Seventh-day Adventists, which oversees the Church's work in Mexico, Central America, the Caribbean, and Northern South America.

Its headquarters, which is the only division of the church whose headquarters is outside its territory, is in Miami, Florida. Founded in 1922, the division membership is 3,694,454 as of June 30, 2021.

List of Member Countries 
Anguilla, Antigua and Barbuda, Aruba, Bahamas, Barbados, Belize, Bonaire, British Virgin Islands, Cayman Islands, Colombia, Costa Rica, Cuba, Curaçao, Dominica, Dominican Republic, El Salvador, French Guiana, Grenada, Guadeloupe, Guatemala, Guyana, Haiti, Honduras, Jamaica, Martinique, Mexico, Montserrat, Nicaragua, Panama, Puerto Rico, Saba, Sint Eustatius, Saint Kitts and Nevis, Saint Lucia, Saint Martin, Saint Vincent and the Grenadines, Suriname, Trinidad and Tobago, Turks and Caicos Islands, United States Virgin Islands, and Venezuela.

Sub Fields

The Inter-American Division (IAD) is divided into eleven Union Conferences and thirteen Union Missions. These are divided into local Conferences and Missions.

  Atlantic Caribbean Union Mission 
 North Bahamas Conference 
 South Bahamas Conference 
 Cayman Islands Conference 
 Turks and Caicos Islands Mission 
 Belize Union Mission 
North Belize Mission
Central Belize Mission
Southwest Belize Mission
 Caribbean Union Conference 
 East Caribbean Conference 
 Grenada Conference 
 Guyana Conference 
 North Caribbean Conference 
 St. Lucia Mission 
ST. Vincent and the Grenadines Mission 
 South Caribbean Conference 
 South Leeward Mission 
 Suriname Mission
 Tobago Mission 
 Central Mexican Union Mission 
 Azteca Mexican Conference 
 Bajio Mexican Conference
 Metropolitan Mexican Conference
 Mexiquense Mexican Conference
 Valley Mexican Mission
 Chiapas Mexican Union Conference 
 Central Chiapas Conference 
 Grijalva Conference
 North Chiapas Conference 
 Palenque Mission
 Soconusco Conference
 South Chiapas Conference
 Upper Chiapas Conference
 West Chiapas Conference
 Cuban Union Conference 
 Central Conference
 Del Amanecer Conference
 East Conference
 Pinarena Mission
 West Conference
 Villa Perla Mission
 Dominican Union Conference 
 Central Dominican Conference 
 East Dominican Conference
 North Dominican Conference
 Northeast Dominican Conference
 South Dominican Conference
 Southeast Dominican Conference
 Dutch Caribbean Union Mission 
 Aruba Mission 
 Bonaire Mission
 Curaçao Conference
 East Venezuela Union Mission 
 Central East Venezuela Mission
 Central Llanos Venezuela Mission
 Central Venezuela Conference 
 East Venezuela Conference 
 Northeast Venezuela Mission
 South Bolivar Venezuela Mission
 South Central Venezuela Conference
 Southeast Venezuela Conference 
 El Salvador Union Mission 
 Central El Salvador Conference
 East El Salvador Conference
 Metropolitan El Salvador Conference
 Paracentral El Salvador Conference
 West El Salvador Conference
 French Antilles-Guiana Union Conference 
 French Guiana Mission 
 Guadeloupe Conference 
 Martinique Conference 
 Guatemala Union Mission 
 Altiplano Guatemala Mission
 Central Guatemala Mission
 East Guatemala Mission
 Lago Guatemala Mission
 Metropolitan Guatemala Conference 
 North Guatemala Mission
 South Guatemala Mission
 West Guatemala Conference 
 Haitian Union Mission 
 Central Haiti Conference 
 North Haiti Mission
 Northwest Haiti Mission
 Plaine du cul de Sac Mission
 South Haiti Mission
 Honduras Union Mission 
 Atlantic Honduras Conference 
 Bay Island Conference
 Central Honduras Conference 
 Comayaguela Mission
 Northwest Honduras Conference
 Inter-Oceanic Mexican Union Conference
 Alpine Mission
 Central Veracruz Mission
 Chontalpa Mission
 Oaxaca Conference
 Olmeca Conference 
 Isthmus Conference
 Los Tuxtlas Mission
 North Veracruz Conference
 Southeast Veracruz Conference
 South Pacific Conference
 South Veracruz Conference 
 Jamaica Union Conference 
 Central Jamaica Conference 
 East Jamaica Conference 
 North Jamaica Conference 
 North East Jamaica Conference 
 West Jamaica Conference 
 North Colombian Union Conference 
 Atlantic Colombian Conference 
 Caribbean Colombian Conference 
 Colombian Islands Mission
 East Central Colombian Conference 
 East Colombian Conference 
 Northeast Colombian Conference 
 Southwest Colombian Mission 
 West Central Colombian Conference 
 North Mexican Union Conference 
 Baja California Conference 
 Chihuahua Mexican Conference
 Gulf Mexican Conference 
 Northeast Mexican Conference 
 North Tamaulipas Mexican Conference 
 Northwest Mexican Mission
 Regiomontana Mission 
 Sinaloa Mexican Conference
 Sonora Mexican Conference
 South Baja California Mission
 West Mexican Conference 
 Panama Union Mission 
 Atlantic Panama Conference 
 Bocas del Toro Mission
 Central Panama Conference 
 Metropolitan Panama Conference 
 Southeast Panama Mission
 West Panama Conference 
 Puerto Rican Union Conference 
 East Puerto Rico Conference 
 North Puerto Rico Conference 
 South Puerto Rico Conference
 West Puerto Rico Conference
 South Central American Union Mission  
 Caribbean Costa Rica Mission 
 Central Nicaragua Mission 
 North Costa Rica Mission 
 Northwestern Nicaragua Mission 
 South Atlantic Nicaragua Mission
 South-Central Costa Rica Conference 
 South Colombian Union Conference 
 Central Colombian Conference 
 East Los Llanos Conference
 Northwestern Bogota and Boyaca Mission 
 Pacific Colombian Conference 
 South Andean Mission
 South Bogota Conference 
 South Colombian Conference 
 South Pacific Mission
 Upper Magdalena Conference 
 Southeast Mexican Union Mission 
 Campeche Mission
 Central Tabasco Conference
 East Tabasco Mission
 Mayab Conference
 North Quintana Roo Conference
 South Quintana Roo Mission
 South Tabasco Conference
 West Venezuela Union Mission 
 Central Andean Venezuela Mission
 East Andean Venezuela Mission
 North Central Venezuela Conference
 Northwestern Venezuela Mission
 Portuguese Venezuela Mission 
 Southwest Venezuela Conference 
 West Central Venezuela Conference 
 West Los Llanos Venezuela Conference 
 West Venezuela Conference
 Yaracuy Venezuela Mission

History

See also
List of Seventh-day Adventist colleges and universities
List of Seventh-day Adventist hospitals
List of Seventh-day Adventist secondary schools
Seventh-day Adventist Church
Seventh-day Adventist Church in Colombia
Seventh-day Adventist Church in Cuba
Seventh-day Adventists in Turks and Caicos Islands

References

Adventist organizations established in the 20th century
Seventh-day Adventist Church in North America
Seventh-day Adventist Church in South America